Cool Gardens is a poetry book by the lead singer of the band System of a Down, Serj Tankian. It was published by MTV Books and was released on October 1, 2002. It is a collection of seven to eight years of Tankian's reflections on life, and features artwork by fellow Angeleno, Sako Shahinian. The poetry, like the songs of System of a Down, consists of a reflection of societies and people's wrongs. It portrays what people do to themselves and the control others try to hold over them.

The book has received much praise in the artistic community.

Fellow poet and musician Saul Williams posted the following comments about Tankian's book:

Serj's words, like his voice, have a distinct aesthetic sensibility connected to an unyielding, visceral roar of passion. His capacity 'to mock a killing bird' while we wonder at the grace, beauty, and colorful range of his wingspan will be the trademark of both of his singing and writing careers. Serj is an amazing artist, full of passion, with a beautiful heart that pumps the essence of his vision and talent.

Poem listing

Prenatal Familiarities
From Words To Portraits
Mer
Businessman vs. Homeless
A Metaphor?
Duty Free Fear
Day Or Night
Matter
The Count
Wet Flower
Mercury
City Of Blinds
Compassion
Brain Waves
Compliment
Rain
Subatomic Music
Days Inn
Partial Moons
Soil
The Void
Sun Bear
Kevorkian Patient's Plee
I Don't Want To Shower
Desystemization
Mix
Information
Silence
Tars
Nil
Reality The Beautiful
Jeffrey, Are You Listening?
Freezing
Pen
Fermented Husbands
Artco.
Indentured Servitude
Dawn
Conquer?
Circus Tiger
Friik
PsychiatryPsychiatry
Orange Light
Words Of A Madman
My Words

Misunderstood Rose
Defeatism
Children
Prop. 192
Child's Man
I Am My Woman
Overload
Time For Bed
Am
Identity
Permanently Plucked
Shine
Now
Self Elimination
New Ear
Dr. Trance
Puzzle
Death
A Mess
Felix The Cat
Revolution
A Letter To Congress
Data
Minute Horizons
Art
Primrose
Touche'
Life Savers
Nations
One Word
Lighter
Addiction
12 Lives
House Of Flies
Cat Naps
Culture
NYC
I Am Ready
Her Eye
Edge Of A Sink
I'm Erica
First Entry
Flux

Adaptations

Audio
On September 22, 2020, Cool Gardens was released as an unabridged audiobook, narrated by author, Tankian. The audiobook format has a runtime of one hour, six minutes. Three videos highlighting the spoken word versions of "Nil," "My Words," and "City of Blinds," featuring art and animation by Philadelphia-based artist D.S. Bradford, were released leading up to and after the audiobook's release.

References 

2002 books
Books by Serj Tankian
System of a Down